Vivo X Fold is a Android-based foldable smartphone developed and manufactured by Vivo. This phone announced on 11 April 2022. On 11 April 2022 was announced Vivo X Fold+ which is improved version of X Fold with more powerful GPU, bigger battery, faster charging and new red color.

References 

Foldable smartphones
Android (operating system) devices
Mobile phones introduced in 2022
Mobile phones with 8K video recording